Shane Moody-Orio (born 7 August 1980 in Corozal) is a Belizean football goalkeeper, who plays for Belmopan Bandits in the Belize First division.

Club career
After playing for several teams in his native Belize, Moody joined Costa Rican side Puntarenas in 2005.

He currently plays with Belmopan Bandits.

International career
He is the first choice goalie for the Belize national football team, making his debut in 2000 against Guatemala. He took part in the World Cup qualifiers against Saint Kitts and Nevis and later Mexico, receiving some praise as a mature player on a young and very limited team.

As of July 2013, he had earned 23 caps.

References

External links

Profile La Nación 
Player profile - Puntarenas FC
[www.laprensa.hn/Deportes/.../Quiero-darle-una-nueva-cara-al-Marathon] (new signing at Marathón)

1980 births
Living people
People from Belize City
Association football goalkeepers
Belizean footballers
Belize international footballers
Belizean expatriate footballers
Puntarenas F.C. players
A.D. Ramonense players
C.D. Marathón players
Expatriate footballers in Costa Rica
Expatriate footballers in Honduras
Belizean expatriate sportspeople in Costa Rica
Belizean expatriate sportspeople in Honduras
Liga Nacional de Fútbol Profesional de Honduras players
Premier League of Belize players
People from Corozal Town
2001 UNCAF Nations Cup players
2005 UNCAF Nations Cup players
2007 UNCAF Nations Cup players
2011 Copa Centroamericana players
2013 CONCACAF Gold Cup players
2014 Copa Centroamericana players
2017 Copa Centroamericana players
Belmopan Bandits players
Boca FC players
San Pedro Seadogs FC players